City and County of St. John was a federal electoral district in New Brunswick, Canada, that was represented in the House of Commons of Canada from 1867 to 1917.

History
Originally, Saint John had a special setup for representation in Parliament. The City of Saint John itself returned one member, and the entire County of Saint John (including the city) returned one as well, and two between 1872 and 1896. In effect, the city itself had two or even three Members of Parliament. This practice continued until 1914.

After 1914, the counties of Saint John and Albert were joined, and the riding was known as St. John—Albert. It returned two Members of Parliament until 1935. In 1966, Albert County was moved to the Fundy—Royal riding and the district became known as Saint John—Lancaster. Saint John—Lancaster riding was abolished in the redistribution of ridings of 1976, and Saint John riding was created.

Members of Parliament

This riding elected the following Members of Parliament:

Election results

See also 
 List of Canadian federal electoral districts
 Past Canadian electoral districts

External links 
 Riding history from the Library of Parliament

Former federal electoral districts of New Brunswick